Impeachment in South Africa is the process by which the legislative body of the Republic of South Africa addresses legal charges against a government official.

Union and republic
When the Union of South Africa was established in 1910, the only officials who could be impeached (though the term itself was not used) were the chief justice and judges of the Supreme Court of South Africa.  The scope was broadened when the country became a republic in 1961, to include the state president.  It was further broadened in 1981 to include the new office of  
vice state president;  and in 1994 to include the executive deputy presidents, provincial premiers, the public protector and the Auditor-General.  Since 1997, members of certain commissions established by the Constitution can also be impeached. The grounds for impeachment, and the procedures to be followed, have changed several times over the years.

Chief Justice and Judges

1910-1994 : the governor-general-in-council (until 1961) or state president (from 1961) could remove a judge from office for "misbehaviour or incapacity" if both the Senate and the House of Assembly submitted addresses to him, during the same session of parliament, asking him to do so.

1994-1997 : the president could remove a judge from office for "misbehaviour, incapacity or incompetence", if both the National Assembly and the Senate requested him to do so, after considering a report from the Judicial Service Commission.

1997-date : the president may remove a judge from office if (a) the Judicial Service Commission finds that the judge "suffers from an incapacity, is grossly incompetent or is guilty of gross misconduct", and (b) the National Assembly resolves, by a two-thirds majority, that the judge be removed.

State President / President

1961-1980 : the Senate and House of Assembly could remove the state president from office for "misconduct or inability to perform efficiently the duties of his office".  The procedure required (a) at least thirty members of the House to petition the Speaker to appoint a joint committee;  (b) the House to resolve to appoint the committee;  (c) the Senate to concur with the resolution, (d) the committee to submit a report;  and (e) each House to resolve, in the same session of parliament, to remove the state president from office.

1981-1984 : following the abolition of the Senate, the power to impeach the state president was vested in the House of Assembly alone.  The same procedure applied to the removal of the vice state president.

1984-1994 : an electoral college, consisting of delegates from the House of Assembly and the new House of Representatives and House of Delegates, could remove the state president from office for "misconduct or inability to perform efficiently the duties of his office".  The procedure required (a) at least half the members of each of the three houses to petition the Speaker of Parliament to appoint a committee;  (b) each house to resolve to appoint the committee;  (c) the committee to submit a report;  and (d) the electoral college to resolve to adopt the report and declare the state president removed from office.

1994-1997 : the National Assembly and the Senate, sitting jointly, could remove the president from office by impeaching him or her for "a serious violation of this Constitution or the other laws of the Republic, or of misconduct or inability rendering him or her unfit to exercise and perform his or her powers and functions".  A two-thirds majority was required.  A similar procedure applied to the removal of any of the executive deputy presidents.

1997-date : the National Assembly (alone) may remove a president, for " a serious violation of the Constitution or the law", "serious misconduct" or "inability to perform the functions of office".  A two-thirds majority is required.  A president who is removed may not receive any benefits of that office, and may not serve in any public office.

Premiers of provinces

1994-1997 : a provincial legislature could remove the province's premier from office by impeaching him or her for "a serious violation of this Constitution or the other laws of the Republic or the province", or for misconduct or inability rendering him or her unfit to exercise and perform his or her powers and functions.  A two-thirds majority was required. 

1997-date : a provincial legislature may remove the province's premier from office for "a serious violation of the Constitution or the law", "serious misconduct" or "inability to perform the functions of office".  A two-thirds majority is required.  A premier who is removed may not receive any benefits of that office, and may not serve in any public office.

Public Protector

1994-1997 : the president could remove him or her from office for "misbehaviour, incapacity or incompetence", if both the Assembly and the Senate requested him to do so, after considering a report from a joint committee.

1997-date : the president must remove the public protector if a committee of the National Assembly finds him or her guilty of "misconduct, incapacity or incompetence", and the Assembly resolves that he or she be removed.  A two-thirds majority is required.

Auditor-General

1994-1997 : the procedure is the same as that for removing the public protector.

1997-date : the procedure is the same as that for removing the public protector.

Members of Commissions

1997-date : the president must remove a member of the South African Human Rights Commission, the Commission for the Promotion and Protection of the Rights of Cultural, Religious and Linguistic Communities, the Commission for Gender Equality or the Electoral Commission from office if a committee of the National Assembly finds him or her guilty of "misconduct, incapacity or incompetence", and the Assembly resolves that he or she be removed.  A simple majority is required.

Pre-Union states

Orange Free State
The Constitution of the Orange Free State republic provided that the Volksraad (legislature)  could impeach the state president and other public officers for "treason, bribery, and other high misdemeanours."  A three-quarters majority vote was required.  The Volksraad's sanction was limited to dismissing the incumbent from office and declaring him unfit to hold any office under the government, but the dismissed president or official remained liable to be prosecuted according to law.

South African Republic
The Constitution of the South African Republic provided that the Volksraad could discharge or dismiss the president from office on conviction for misconduct, embezzlement of state property, treason or other serious crimes.  He was liable to be prosecuted for such offences.

References

Parliament of South Africa
South Africa